Desmond "Desi" Washington (born July 6, 1992) is an American professional basketball player for Szedeák of the NB I/A. He played college basketball with the Delaware State Hornets and Saint Peter's Peacocks.

Professional career
On July 17, 2017, he signed with Igokea. He made his debut for the Igokea in their season opener on October 2, 2017, scoring 35 points, six rebounds, four assists and one steal against Petrol Olimpija. On November 24, 2017, he left Igokea and signed with Dynamic. He left Dynamic after the end of Adriatic season.

On May 13, 2020, Washington joined Hapoel Holon of the Israeli Premier League.

On July 24, 2020, Washington signed with 1881 Düzce Belediye. He joined Antalya Güneşi of the Turkish Basketball First League in 2021 and averaged 16.9 points, 5.9 assists, 5.0 rebounds, and 1.3 steals per game.

On November 26, 2021, Washington signed with Élan Chalon of the LNB Pro B.

References

External links
Eurobasket.com Profile
RealGM Profile
ESPN Profile Profile
ABA League Profile
FOX Sports Profile
DSUHornets Profile 

1992 births
Living people
ABA League players
American expatriate basketball people in Bosnia and Herzegovina
American expatriate basketball people in Saudi Arabia
American expatriate basketball people in Serbia
American expatriate basketball people in Turkey
American men's basketball players
Basketball League of Serbia players
Basketball players from Harrisburg, Pennsylvania
Delaware State Hornets men's basketball players
KK Dynamic players
KK Igokea players
Point guards
Saint Peter's Peacocks men's basketball players